Peter Gregory Asch "Pasch" (born October 16, 1948) is a retired American water polo player from the United States, who won the bronze medal with the Men's National Team at the 1972 Summer Olympics in Munich, West Germany.  Asch is Jewish.

During his college career at UC Berkeley, Asch served as water polo team captain from 1968–1969, earned All-America honors in water polo for the Bears three straight years from 1967–69, and finished second in the first ever NCAA men's water polo championship. In addition, set the record for spending 9 straight hours at Kip's – along with the Shark, WilloDome, the Freak and the Snake. He also served as chapter president for Sigma Alpha Epsilon fraternity.

Asch currently lives in California. In 1984, he was inducted into the USA Water Polo Hall of Fame.

See also
 List of Olympic medalists in water polo (men)
 List of select Jewish water polo players

References

External links
 

Place of birth missing (living people)
1948 births
Living people
American male water polo players
California Golden Bears men's water polo players
Medalists at the 1972 Summer Olympics
Olympic bronze medalists for the United States in water polo
Water polo players at the 1972 Summer Olympics
Jewish American sportspeople
21st-century American Jews